Makashule Gana (born 11 August 1983) is a South African politician who served as a member of the Gauteng Provincial Legislature for the opposition Democratic Alliance. He was previously a member of the National Assembly, where he was Shadow Minister of Human Settlements between 2014 and 2016. Gana also served as the Deputy Federal Chairperson of the DA until 2015. He was previously leader of the DA Youth and DA councillor in the City of Johannesburg, he holds a BSc degree and is currently registered for a Postgraduate Diploma in Management at the Wits Business School.

Childhood and education 
Gana was born in Lefara Village in the town of Tzaneen on 11 August 1983. He has two siblings and was raised by his late mother, Gavaza. Gana was a herd boy in his village. He started primary school at Mushoti Primary in 1988. He attended N'wahungani Junior Secondary in 1995 and thereafter moved schools plenty of times. He moved to Lefara School in July 1996, before moving to DZJ Secondary School later on in 1996. Gana matriculated from Giyani High School in 1999.

In 2000, Gana enrolled for his undergraduate degree at the then University of the North (now known as the University of Limpopo), where he attained a Bachelor of Science Degree in 2003, with majors in mathematics and computer science. He also achieved a Postgraduate Diploma in Management from Wits Business School in 2012.

Political career
Gana joined the South African Students Congress at the University of Limpopo (then University of the North) in 2000. He joined the Democratic Alliance (DA) and DA Youth in 2002. He was elected Limpopo Provincial Chairperson of the Democratic Alliance Students Organization in 2003. and moved to Johannesburg in 2005, where he continued to be very active in the DA and DA Youth.

Gana was elected Branch Youth Chairperson for the Johannesburg Innercity in 2006 and was soon advanced to the post of DA Youth Chairperson for the Johannesburg Central Constituency in 2007. He participated in the DA Young Leaders programme in 2008, and was elected Gauteng South DA Youth Chairperson in 2008.

Gana became a DA city councillor in June 2009 when he was elected to the Johannesburg Metropolitan Council, and later on, became DA Youth Federal Leader in July 2010. At the 2012 DA Federal Congress, he was elected as one of the three Deputy Federal Chairpersons of the party. As a result of this, he resigned as Youth Leader in May 2013. Mbali Ntuli was appointed as his successor. He was elected to Parliament for the DA in 2014 and served as the Shadow Minister of Human Settlements until November 2016, when he left the National Assembly to fill a DA vacancy in the Gauteng Provincial Legislature. His move was part of a broader strategy to win the province in the 2019 elections.

Gana has been active in campaigning for a national youth subsidy in South Africa, and helped to establish a DA political school with fellow leader Khume Ramulifho in Gauteng’s southern region.

In October 2019, Gana declared his candidacy to succeed Mmusi Maimane as leader of the DA. He faced John Steenhuisen for the position. The election was held on 17 November 2019. Gana lost to Steenhuisen.

He has resigned from the DA and as a member of the Gauteng Legislature on 4 August 2022.

References 

Living people
Democratic Alliance (South Africa) politicians
1983 births
University of Limpopo alumni
University of the Witwatersrand alumni
Members of the Gauteng Provincial Legislature